Quentin Pacher (born 6 January 1992 in Libourne) is a French cyclist, who currently rides for UCI WorldTeam . In August 2020, he was named in the startlist for the 2020 Tour de France.

Major results

2012
 1st  Mountains classification Kreiz Breizh Elites
 10th Overall Ronde de l'Isard
1st Stage 3
2014
 5th Trofeo Edil C
2015
 1st  Young rider classification Tour du Haut Var
 1st  Mountains classification Rhône-Alpes Isère Tour
 7th Grand Prix de Plumelec-Morbihan
2016
 6th Overall Vuelta a la Comunidad de Madrid
 8th Grand Prix de Plumelec-Morbihan
 9th Paris–Camembert
 9th Tour du Doubs
2017
 6th Overall Arctic Race of Norway
 8th Hong Kong Challenge
2018
 1st Stage 5 Tour de Savoie Mont-Blanc
 2nd Famenne Ardenne Classic
 4th Overall Tour de Wallonie
 5th Overall Sharjah International Cycling Tour
 7th Classic de l'Ardèche
 8th Overall Tour du Haut Var
 9th Tour du Gévaudan Occitanie
 10th Overall Tour La Provence
 10th Volta Limburg Classic
2019
 2nd Overall Circuit de la Sarthe
 4th Volta Limburg Classic
 5th Overall Tour de Wallonie
 9th Tour du Doubs
 10th Overall Tour of Oman
2020
 5th Overall Tour de Langkawi
2021
 6th Overall Tour du Rwanda
 9th Bretagne Classic
  Combativity award Stage 13 Tour de France
2022
 7th Faun-Ardèche Classic
 9th Trofeo Laigueglia
 10th Overall Étoile de Bessèges

Grand Tour general classification results timeline

References

External links

1992 births
Living people
People from Libourne
French male cyclists
Sportspeople from Gironde
Cyclists from Nouvelle-Aquitaine